Bob Baker or Bobby Baker may refer to:

 Bob Baker (actor) (1910–1975), American singer and actor
 Bob Baker (American football) (born 1927), American football coach
 Bob Baker (basketball) (1919–1950), American professional basketball player
 Bob Baker (boxer) (1926–2002), American heavyweight boxer
 Bob Baker (ice hockey) (1926–2012), American ice hockey player
 Bob Baker (politician) (1917–1985), Australian politician
 Bob Baker (scriptwriter) (1939–2021), British television and film writer
 Bobby Baker (1928–2017), American political advisor to Lyndon Johnson
 Bobby Baker (artist) (born 1950), English performance artist
 Bob Baker (director) (born 1952), Canadian theatre director
 Bobby Baker (racing driver), American NASCAR driver

See also 
 Bob Baker Memorial Airport, a public airport in Alaska
 Bob Baker Marionette Theater, founded by Bob Baker and Alton Wood in 1963, the oldest children's theater company in Los Angeles
 Robert Baker (disambiguation)